Spencer Cosby (October 2, 1867 – March 26, 1962) was a U.S. Army officer who served as military attaché of the U.S. Embassy in Paris, France and as Engineering Commissioner of the District of Columbia.

Biography
He was born on October 2, 1867, in Maryland. He was appointed as a military cadet in the United States Military Academy in June 1887 and graduated first in his class four years later, as an officer in the United States Army Corps of Engineers. Among his assignments was work on new gun batteries at Fort Delaware in 1897. Cosby received an honorable discharge from the US Volunteers on December 31, 1898, at the rank of major. However, he remained in the regular army, in which he became a captain on February 2, 1901.

In March 1909 he was appointed in charge of public buildings and grounds for the District of Columbia, with the rank of colonel.

On September 16, 1909 in Southampton, New York he married E. Yvonne Shepard, the daughter of Dr. Charles R. Shepard.

He managed the design and construction of new White House executive offices and the Oval Office. In 1912 he supervised the planting of Japanese cherry trees at the United States Capitol. On August 7, 1913, he was assigned duty as the military attaché at the Embassy of the United States in Paris, France.

He died at his home in Washington, D.C., on March 26, 1962, at age 94. He was buried in Arlington National Cemetery.

References

1867 births
1962 deaths
Burials at Arlington National Cemetery
Place of birth missing
People from Maryland
Military personnel from Washington, D.C.
United States Army colonels
United States Military Academy alumni
United States Army personnel of World War I